Salia  is a genus of moths of the family Noctuidae. The genus was erected by Jacob Hübner in 1818.

Species
Salia acidalialis (Guenée, 1854) Cayenne
Salia acuminatalis (Walker, [1866])
Salia albivia (Hampson, 1950) British Guiana
Salia anna (H. Druce, 1891) Panama
Salia anthippe (H. Druce, 1891) Mexico
Salia anyte (H. Druce, 1891) Mexico
Salia bidentalis (Warren, 1889) Brazil (Amazonas)
Salia brevilinealis (Schaus, 1916) Cayenne
Salia compta (Walker, 1865) Brazil
Salia euphrionalis (Walker, 1859) Brazil
Salia ferrigeralis (Walker, [1866]) Dominican Republic
Salia hastiferalis (Walker, [1859]) Venezuela
Salia hermia (Schaus, 1916) Cayenne
Salia leosalis (Walker, [1859])
Salia lyceus (H. Druce, 1891) Panama, Mexico
Salia lysippusalis (Walker, [1859]) Brazil
Salia lysizona (H. Druce, 1891) Mexico
Salia macarialis (Guenée, 1854) Brazil (Amazonas), Cayenne
Salia mago (H. Druce, 1891) Mexico
Salia mialis (Guenée, 1854) Cayenne, Brazil (Amazonas)
Salia mikani (Felder & Rogenhofer, 1874) Brazil (Amazonas)
Salia mimalis Hübner, [1818] Brazil
Salia moribundalis (Guenée, 1854) Cayenne
Salia onesalis (Schaus, 1906) Brazil (Parana)
Salia otisalis (Walker, [1859]) Venezuela
Salia polycletusalis (Walker, [1859]) Brazil (Amazonas)
Salia remulcens (Felder & Rogenhofer, 1874) Brazil (Amazonas)
Salia semiothisa (Schaus, 1916) British Guiana
Salia submarcata (Schaus, 1916) Cayenne
Salia terricola (Möschler, 1880) Suriname
Salia trinidalis (Dognin, 1914) Trinidad

References

Herminiinae